Sarao is a surname. Notable people with the name include:

 Leonardo S. Sarao (1921–2001), Filipino automotive businessman
 Sarao Motors, Filipino automotive manufacturing company
 Manuel Sarao (born 1989), Italian footballer
 Navinder Sarao (born 1978), British stock trader and manipulator